The KR men's basketball team, commonly known as KR or KR Basket, is a professional basketball club based in Reykjavík, Iceland. It is the men's basketball department of Knattspyrnufélag Reykjavíkur (English: Reykjavík Football Club) multi-sport club. It has won the Icelandic championship eighteen times, the most national championships in the men's top-tier league history. It won a record 6 national champions in a row from 2014 to 2019. In 2017 the club played in FIBA Europe Cup for the first time since 2008. In March 2023, the team was relegated to the second-tier 1. deild karla for the first time in its history.

KR has a men's reserve team that plays in the amateur level Icelandic 3rd-tier Division II and the Icelandic basketball cup, called KR-b. It is also affiliated with Knattspyrnufélag Vesturbæjar.

Honors
 Úrvalsdeild karla (18):
1965, 1966, 1967, 1968, 1974, 1978, 1979, 1990, 2000, 2007, 2009, 2011, 2014, 2015, 2016, 2017, 2018, 2019

 Icelandic Basketball Cup (14):
1966, 1967, 1970, 1971, 1972, 1973, 1974, 1977, 1979, 1984, 1991, 2011, 2016, 2017

 Icelandic Supercup (4):
2000, 2007, 2014, 2015

 Company Cup (2):
2008, 2014

Season by season

Notable players

Head coaches

References

External links
Official Website
Eurobasket team profile
KR 2019-2020 profile  

KR (basketball)
Sport in Reykjavík
Knattspyrnufélag Reykjavíkur